Carex rubrobrunnea is a tussock-forming species of perennial sedge in the family Cyperaceae. It is native to parts of eastern Asia from Assam in India in the west to China and Vietnam in the east.

See also
List of Carex species

References

rubrobrunnea
Plants described in 1894
Taxa named by Charles Baron Clarke
Flora of Assam (region)
Flora of China
Flora of Tibet
Flora of Vietnam